XHAUC-TDT (virtual channel 6) is a television station affiliated with Multimedios Televisión in Chihuahua, Chihuahua. The concession for the station is held by Telemisión, S.A. de C.V., a business of José de Jesús Partida Villanueva. It is co-owned with XHTX-TDT in Tuxtla Gutiérrez, Chiapas. Partida Villanueva also built XEJPV-AM in Ciudad Juárez.

History 

XHAUC received its concession on November 15, 1991 but did not sign on until 1996. Telemisión's application beat out competing bids from eleven other applicants for the station.

Until 2018, Televisa supplied programs to XHAUC, which broadcast local programs and Nu9ve (formerly Gala TV) network programming. On January 1, 2019, all Televisa Chihuahua local programming moved to the second subchannel of 9.1 XHCHZ-TDT, leaving XHAUC without any programs, as a result of the disaffiliation of Telemisión from Televisa. After three weeks of carrying a slide showing the station's logo and transmitter, XHAUC began broadcasting Milenio Televisión on January 24.

XHAUC became a full-time Multimedios Televisión affiliate in May 2019. As a result, XHAUC was relocated to channel 6 in July 2019.

Digital television 
XHAUC-TDT broadcasts on RF channel 32 (virtual channel 6).

Digital subchannels

References

External links
Grupo PARAM COM corporate website

Mass media in Chihuahua City
1996 establishments in Mexico
Television stations in Chihuahua